Map of places in Flintshire compiled from this list
See the list of places in Wales for places in other principal areas.

This is a list of towns and villages in the principal area of Flintshire, Wales.

 

A
Afonwen
Alltami
Argoed
Aston Park

B
Babell
Bagillt
Bretton
Broughton
Bryn-y-Baal
Brynford
Buckley

C
Cadole
Caergwrle
Caerwys
Carmel
Cefn-y-Bedd
Cilcain
Connah's Quay

D
Deeside
Downing
Drury

E
Ewloe

F
Flint
Ffrith
Ffynnongroyw

G
Glan-y-Don
Glyncorrwg
Greenfield
Gronant
Gwaenysgor
Gwernaffield
Gwernymynydd

H
Halkyn
Hawarden
Higher Kinnerton
Holywell
Hope

L
Leeswood
Lixwm
Llanasa
Llanerch-y-Mor 
Llanfynydd
Lloc

M
Mancot
Milwr
Mold
Mostyn
Mynydd Isa

N
Nannerch
Nercwys
New Brighton, Flintshire
Northop
Northop Hall

O
Oakenholt

P
Pantasaph
Pantymwyn
Pentre Halkyn
Penyffordd
Pentre

Q
Queensferry

R
Rhosesmor
Rhydymwyn
Rhyl

S
Sealand 
Shotton
Sychdyn
Saltney
Saltney Ferry
Sandycroft

T
Talacre
Trelawnyd
Treuddyn

W
Whelston
Whitford

Y
Yr Wyddgrug
Ysceifiog

See also
List of places in Wales
List of places in Flintshire (categorised)

Flintshire